Iamalele (Yamalele) is an Austronesian language spoken on Fergusson Island in Milne Bay Province of Papua New Guinea.

References 

Nuclear Papuan Tip languages
Languages of Milne Bay Province